Ken Rosewall and Fred Stolle defeated Roy Emerson and Rod Laver 6–3, 6–4, 6–3 in the final to win the men's doubles title at the 1968 French Open tennis tournament. John Newcombe and Tony Roche were the defending champions but chose not to defend their title.

Seeds

  Rod Laver /  Roy Emerson (final)
  Ken Rosewall /  Fred Stolle (champions)
  Bob Hewitt /  Frew McMillan (semifinals)
  Andrés Gimeno /  Richard Pancho Gonzales (quarterfinals)
  Ilie Năstase /  Ion Ţiriac (semifinals)
  Owen Davidson /  Michael Sangster (third round)
  Thomaz Koch /  José Edison Mandarino (quarterfinals)
  John Alexander /  Dick Crealy (second round)

Draw

Finals

Top half

Section 1

Section 2

Bottom half

Section 3

Section 4

References

External links
 Association of Tennis Professionals (ATP) – main draw
1968 French Open – Men's draws and results at the International Tennis Federation

Men's Doubles
1968